Beiding Island (Dodd Island, Pei-ting Tao, Beiding Dao) (pinyin: Běidìng Dǎo) is an island located east of Greater Kinmen in Jinhu Township, Kinmen County, Fujian Province, Republic of China (Taiwan).

On September 8, 1978, a butchers group from Jinhu visited Dongding Island and Beiding Island to bring gifts to the soldiers there. They wished the soldiers a happy upcoming Mid-Autumn Festival.

On March 31, 2018, the Chinese freight ship YUAN TAI（遠泰）789 struck rocks in the waters near Beiding Island. Nine crew members escaped without injury.

See also
 List of islands of Taiwan

References

Islands of Fujian, Republic of China
Landforms of Kinmen County